Admiral Ushakov was the lead ship in her class of armoured warships (coastal battleships) of the Imperial Russian Navy, and named after Admiral Fyodor Fyodorovich Ushakov the Russian naval commander of the 18th century.

Service life 
Admiral Ushakov was part of the Baltic Fleet at the beginning of the Russo-Japanese war. Admiral Ushakov was chosen to form part of Admiral Nikolai Nebogatov's Third Pacific Squadron which was sent out to reinforce Admiral Zinovy Rozhestvensky on his journey to the Far East. The ship was obsolete and was not considered suitable for a voyage to the Pacific. Journeying via the Suez Canal and across the Indian Ocean, they linked up with Rozhestvensky's fleet off Cam Ranh Bay in Indochina and proceeded together to the Straits of Tsushima.

At the Battle of Tsushima, on 27–28 May 1905, Admiral Ushakov was separated from Nebogatov during the night and fought to the last. She was twice hit below the water line and once above, the blazing wreck being scuttled on the evening of 28 May.

Notes

References 
 
 
 
 
 

1893 ships
Ships built at Admiralty Shipyard
Battleships of the Imperial Russian Navy
Russo-Japanese War battleships of Russia
Maritime incidents in 1905
Shipwrecks in the Tsushima Strait
Shipwrecks of the Russo-Japanese War